Miha Gale (born 29 January 1977) is a Slovenian freestyle skier. He competed at the 1998 Winter Olympics and the 2002 Winter Olympics.

References

External links
 

1977 births
Living people
Slovenian male freestyle skiers
Olympic freestyle skiers of Slovenia
Freestyle skiers at the 1998 Winter Olympics
Freestyle skiers at the 2002 Winter Olympics
Skiers from Ljubljana